Matti Lund Nielsen (born 8 May 1988) is a Danish professional footballer who plays as a midfielder for Hvidovre IF. 

Nielsen has amassed a total 46 youth caps for Denmark under five different age groups, but has yet to earn a senior cap.

Career

OB
Nielsen made his professional debut for OB on 4 March 2007 in the Royal League game against Lillestrøm.

He was sent on a one-season loan for the 2008–09 season to Lyngby Boldklub.

Nordsjælland
In December 2009, Nielsen signed a two-and-a-half-year contract with Danish Superliga club Nordsjælland starting from 1 January 2010.

Pescara
On 30 December 2011, it was confirmed that Nielsen would transfer to Pescara on a free transfer, signing a contract until summer 2014.

Return to OB
On 19 September 2015, OB announced that Nielsen was signed for the remainder of the calendar year.

Reggina
On 7 January 2020, he returned to Italy, signing a one-and-a-half-year contract with Serie C club Reggina.

Pro Vercelli
On 22 September 2020, he moved to Pro Vercelli.

Career statistics

Club

Honours
Nordsjælland
 Danish Superliga: 2011–12
 Danish Cup: 2009–10, 2010–11

Pescara
 Serie B: 2011–12

References

External links

Profile at DBU.dk 
Matti Lund Nielsen on Altomfotball

1988 births
Living people
Footballers from Odense
Association football midfielders
Danish men's footballers
Danish expatriate men's footballers
Denmark under-21 international footballers
Denmark youth international footballers
Danish Superliga players
Serie A players
Serie B players
Serie C players
Eliteserien players
Odense Boldklub players
Lyngby Boldklub players
FC Nordsjælland players
Delfino Pescara 1936 players
Hellas Verona F.C. players
Sarpsborg 08 FF players
Reggina 1914 players
F.C. Pro Vercelli 1892 players
Hvidovre IF players
Danish expatriate sportspeople in Italy
Danish expatriate sportspeople in Norway
Expatriate footballers in Italy
Expatriate footballers in Norway